To the Maxximum is the debut album by the German Eurodance project Maxx. The album was first released in June 1994 in Germany via Blow Up and Intercord. The album was also released in Scandinavia via Remixed Records and in the UK via Pulse 8 records. The hits "Get-A-Way", "No More (I Can't Stand It)" and "You Can Get It" are all featured on the album.

Track listing

Credits
Artwork – I-D Büro
Engineer (mix) – Robert Lee
Engineer (recording) – Luke Steward
Engineer (sequence design & acoustic structures) – The Movement
Executive producer – The Hitman
Instruments – Dakota O'Neil, George Torpey
Lyrics – Gary Bokoe (tracks: 3 5 8 10 13 14)
Mixed by – Dee O'Neil, George Torpey
Music, lyrics – Dakota O'Neil, Dawhite (tracks: 3 4 5 7 10 12), George Torpey, The Hitman
Photography – Axel Jansen
Producer – The Movement
Vocals – Gary Bokoe, Linda Meek

Charts

References

External links
Profile on rateyourmusic.com
 

1994 debut albums
Maxx (eurodance act) albums